"Riverboat Shuffle" is a popular song composed by Hoagy Carmichael, Irving Mills, and Dick Voynow. Lyrics were later added by Carmichael and Mitchell Parish. 

First recorded by Bix Beiderbecke and The Wolverines in 1924, the piece was Carmichael's first composition and it would become a Dixieland standard. Carmichael would go on to write many popular jazz standards, including "Stardust" (1927), "Georgia on My Mind" (1930), and "Lazy River" (1931). Beiderbecke and the Wolverines released the song as a Gennett 78 record (5454-A, Matrix #11854 524). Beiderbecke also recorded a second version of the song in 1927 with Frankie Trumbauer and His Orchestra, which was released as an Okeh Records 78 (40822).

Renditions

Benson Orchestra of Chicago (1925), 32715-4 VICTOR 19688B
Richard Hitter's Cabineers (1925), SAH4 CLOVER EBS1063
Jimmy Joy's St. Anthony's Hotel Orchestra featuring Jimmy Maloney (1925), 9108-A OKEH 40388
Red Nichols and His Five Pennies (1927), E24225 BRUNSWICK 6820 (re-recorded and released in 1950 by Capitol Records)
Frankie Trumbauer and His Orchestra featuring Bix Beiderbecke (1927), OKEH 40822
The Cotton Club Orchestra, COLUMBIA 374-D 
Adrian Rollini and His Orchestra (1934), 38878 DECCA 265B
Glen Gray and the Casa Loma Orchestra (1939), 64962-A DECCA 2398B
Muggsy Spanier Ragtime Band  (1939), 043894-2 BLUEBIRD 10532
Sidney Bechet with Claude Luter (1949), BLUENOTE BN568
Muggsy Spanier and His Ragtime Band, V-DISC 307B1
Tex Beneke and His Orchestra
Acker Bilk
Billy May and His Orchestra
Eddie Condon
George Brunies and His Jazz Band
The Dukes of Dixieland
Matty Matlock
Wild Bill Davison
Jack Teagarden and His Jazz Band
Ray Bauduc-Nappy Lamare and Their Dixieland Band

See also
List of 1920s jazz standards

Notes

External links
"Riverboat Shuffle" at jazzstandards.com

1924 songs
1920s jazz standards
Dixieland jazz standards
Songs with music by Hoagy Carmichael
Songs with lyrics by Irving Mills
Songs with lyrics by Mitchell Parish